Crook is a market town in the district and ceremonial county of County Durham, Northern England. The town is located on the edge of Weardale, therefore is sometimes referred to as the "Gateway to Weardale".

The town is in an unparished area, until 1974 it was in Crook and Willington Urban District and was parished. It is located a couple of miles north of the River Wear. The A690 road from Durham turns into the A689 leading up through Wolsingham and Stanhope into the upper reaches of Weardale (an Area of Outstanding Natural Beauty).

The centre of Crook, a designated conservation area, features a variety of shops and businesses with the market held on Tuesday mornings and a few stalls on a Saturday. There are two prominent churches, the centrally located St Catherine's CE and Our Lady Immaculate & St Cuthbert's RC on Church Hill. On top of the hills to the east sits Crook Golf Club.

History
Crook first appeared as an agricultural village around 1795 although its surrounding districts; Billy Row, Stanley, White Lea and Helmington Row, were established much earlier. In these days Crook was predominantly farmland; however, it also had an Inn and a blacksmith shop, consequently the primary field of employment was within the agricultural industry. 40 years later; Crook became a mining village, and thrived as the coal was very close to the surface and soon there were over 20 mines around the Crook area. By the end of the nineteenth century the town had developed rapidly, in population and economy. However the local population declined in the following century, as the coal mines and industries closed. With at one point over 34% of the population being unemployed.

Crook's football team, Crook Town F.C., have won the FA Amateur Cup five times, most recently beating Enfield F.C. in 1964, before the cup was abolished in 1974. This record is second only to Crook's near neighbours, Bishop Auckland F.C. The club have also reached the third round of the FA Cup and formed a key role in the development of FC Barcelona, playing a number of friendly matches in the 1910s and 1920s.

The town is also home to oldest purpose built Cinema in the North, built as the Electric Palace and opened on 21 November 1910. Currently the building is a Car Parts and Accessories shop but a [www.empirecrook.co.uk]group was set up in 2015 with the intention of restoring the building back to a working cinema. Much of the original interior features remain inside and a local charity Empire Electric Palace Theatre (Crook) CIO is working to gain control of the building a restore it to a working theatre for the community.

In 2014, Lidl announced they were to open a new store in Crook, on the site of the former Co-op Food store on New Road, the store opened in June 2017. In September 2016, Aldi announced plans to open a new store in the town on Elliott street, which was to create 30 new jobs. The store opened in October 2019.

Landscape 

Crook has a backdrop of traditional and modern buildings. The hills surround the town on all sides apart from the south side of the town. The tallest hill stands at 300 metres above the town, about 980 ft. The highest point in the town is on West Road where the height is 210 metres (about 690 ft).

Approximately 2 miles to the west of Crook on the A689, back towards Wolsingham and Weardale is the surviving World War II Harperley POW Camp 93.

Landmarks

The Cenotaph 
A World War 1 and World War 2 Cenotaph, located in the market place.

The Devil's Stone\The Blue Stone 
An erratic of Borrowdale volcanic. Originally located at Dowfold Hill, it is currently situated in the market place.

Education 
Crook schools consist of a diverse range of ages and ethnicities.

Nursery

Crook Nursery School 
Crook Nursery is an average-sized school that serves the immediate area.  The current headteacher is Mrs J C Thompson.

Primary

Crook Primary School
Crook Primary School was opened formerly in 1950.
A larger than average community school that shares a site with Crook Nursery School. It has a pupil capacity of 371. It has more disabled, special educational needs and free school meal eligible pupils than the national average. 
The current headteacher is Mrs Antonella Lupton.

Marilyn Tempest – a local legendary teacher – retired after thirty years of employment on 30 April 2014 and received a standing ovation from the then current pupils and teachers. During an interview with The Northern Echo, she said "I have had the most wonderful time here, teaching is the best job in the world.".

Hartside Primary School
A smaller than average community school, it has a pupil capacity of 210. It also has a large proportion of children with special educational needs and/or disabilities. The current headteacher is Mr Shawn Laws.

St Cuthbert's RC Primary School
An average-sized voluntary aided Roman Catholic school, with a pupil capacity of 210. The proportion of pupils with disabilities and/or special educational needs is below average, although the amount eligible for free school meals are above average and ever increasing. The current headteacher is Miss McElhone.

Culture 

Crook hosts various annual events including Crook Carnival, Crook Community Christmas Event and the Crookfest music festival.

Crook Carnival is held in early July and features a parade, rides, stalls and live music. Crook Community Christmas Event held at the end of November also features a parade and the switching on of the town's Christmas lights.

Crookfest is an all day music festival held on the Sunday of the early May Bank Holiday weekend within Crook AFC's Sir Tom Cowie Millfield ground. It is organised by Marshall Rippon on behalf of the football club and features around 20 bands over 3 stages with marquees erected on the pitch.

Crook has a relatively large number of public houses and eateries for a town of it's size. There is a healthy local music scene within the town, with live performances every weekend.

There are also various clubs and societies based within the town.

Malcolm Dixon (born 1953) is an actor best known as Strutter in the 1981 movie Time Bandits. He has had many roles that take advantage of his 4'1" size, such as Ewoks and dwarfs. Before becoming an actor, Dixon worked in Jim Henson's Creature Shop.

Notable people
People associated with Crook include:
 Jack Greenwell, FC Barcelona's first official coach who won two Spanish Cups and four Catalan titles.
 Darren Holloway, former professional footballer with English Premier League side Sunderland AFC. Also played for Wimbledon, Bradford City, Darlington and Gateshead (loans Carlisle United, Bolton Wanderers and Scunthorpe United).
 Bill Rowe, 2 time BAFTA Award for Best Sound winning sound engineer who worked on over 160 films between 1955 and 1992.
 Constantine Scollen, a missionary priest among the Blackfoot and Cree peoples of Canada in the late 19th century.
 Nigel Wright, former 3 time English light welterweight professional boxing champion. Also 2 time challenger for British and Commonwealth titles.
 Brian Foster , particle physicist and Donald H Perkins Professor of Experimental Physics at the University of Oxford.

Transport
Bus

To the north a once a day Crook to Consett Weardale Motor Services service 765. A once an hour Arriva North East X1 runs to Tow Law Monday to Saturday.

Towards Willington and Durham the Arriva North East X46 services runs every 20 minutes Monday to Saturday and every hour on Sundays.

Towards the south (Bishop Auckland and Darlington) Weardale Motor Servcies run every hour to Bishop Auckland with there service 101 and Arriva North East X1 runs every 30 minutes during the day Monday to Saturday.

To the West the Weardale Motor Services 101 services runs every hour to Stanhope were you can connect to other bus services up further into Weardale. A town service also runs between thistleflat, Stanley crook and Watergate estate runs during the day Monday to Saturday

Twin towns
Bad Oeynhausen

Ivry - Sur - Seine

Gallery

References

External links
Community website about Crook
 St. Catherine's Church – the Anglican Church website
 Empire Electric Palace Theatre – Oldest cinema in the North

 
Towns in County Durham
Unparished areas in County Durham